Horses is a 2014 Italian drama film written and directed by Michele Rho. It premiered out of competition at the 68th Venice International Film Festival.

Cast 

 Vinicio Marchioni as Alessandro
 Michele Alhaique as Pietro
 Giulia Michelini as Veronica
 Antonella Attili as Amanda 
 Duccio Camerini as Pancia 
 Asia Argento as Mother
 Cesare Apolito as Father 
 Pippo Delbono as Dario 
 Andrea Occhipinti as Inglese

References

External links 

2011 films
Italian drama films
2011 drama films
2010s Italian films